San Domenico di Guzman may refer to :

 the Italian for Saint Dominic of Guzman
 Italian churches dedicated to him, notably
 San Domenico di Guzman (Rome), a cardinal-deaconry and Roman parish church 
 Basilica of San Domenico, in Bologna
 San Domenico di Guzman (oratorio) an oratorio by Antonio Braga based on the saint's life